"Just a Step from Heaven" is a song by British girl group Eternal, released as the third single from their debut album, Always & Forever (1993). Released on 18 April 1994, the single entered at number 12 on the UK Singles Chart on 24 April and climbed to its peak of number eight three weeks later. The single spent 11 weeks on the UK Singles Chart. It also reached the top 30 in Ireland and New Zealand and experienced minimal success in North America.

Critical reception
Jon O'Brien from AllMusic complimented the song as an example of "perfect R&B-infused pop". Larry Flick from Billboard magazine wrote, "A glowing moment from the noteworthy Always & Forever album, this midtempo jam chugs along with rich harmonies, a diva-driven lead vocal, and an arrangement that pads a hip-hop foundation with sweet retro-soul nuances and a killer chorus. Juicy." Mark Frith from Smash Hits gave it five out of five and named it Best New Sngle, commenting, "At first I wasn't very sure about this. Not as sultry and soully as "Stay", missing the great infectious pop energy of "Save Our Love". After listen number five it strikes you — this has the best of both and is the pick of the bunch. Sassy, well-sung and a little bit funky, "Just a Step from Heaven" is another big hit. And the video, directed by the person behind the Salt N Pepa/ En Vogue "Whatta Man" promo, is meant to be a little special too. We've probably lost them to America but Eternal are a jewel well worth keeping."

Track listings

 UK and Australian CD single
 "Just a Step from Heaven" (radio mix)
 "Stay" (Teddy Riley remix)
 "I've Got to Be with You"
 "Fantasy"

 UK 7-inch and cassette single
 "Just a Step from Heaven" (remix)
 "I've Got to Be with You"
 "Stay" (Teddy Riley "Eternal" remix)

 UK 12-inch single
A1. "Just a Step from Heaven" (West End Wild & Groovy mix)
A2. "Just a Step from Heaven" (West End RnB Rub mix)
B1. "Just a Step from Heaven" (Frankie Foncett mix)
B2. "Stay" (Teddy Riley remix)

 US cassette single
A1. "Just a Step from Heaven"
B1. "I've Got to Be with You"
B2. "Stay" (extended mix)

 Japanese mini-CD single
 "Just a Step from Heaven" (radio mix)
 "Stay" (Teddy Riley remix)

Credits and personnel
Credits are lifted from the Always & Forever album booklet.

Studios
 Recorded at Roundhouse Studios (London, England)
 Mixed at RG Jones Studios (London, England)

Personnel
 Wayne Cohen – writing
 Sheppard Solomon – writing
 Dennis Charles – production
 Ronnie Wilson – production
 Johnny Douglas – additional production and remix

Charts

Weekly charts

Year-end charts

References

Eternal (band) songs
1993 songs
1994 singles
EMI Records singles
First Avenue Records singles
Songs written by Sheppard Solomon